The Finland women's national rugby union team represents Finland internationally in rugby union. They made their international debut in 2007.

History
The women's national team was created in 2006 and the team competed in the Stockholm 10's tournament in 2006.
Finland started to build a national 15-team for the 2007 Women's European Championships in Belgium, which saw the Finnish team end up in fifth place after defeating Luxembourg in the 5th/6th place final.

Results summary
(Full internationals only)

Players

Current squad
This is the list of players that competed in the 2022-23 Rugby Europe Women's Trophy.
 Caps updated as of 20 March 2023

Coaching staff 
 Head Coach: Jake Pratley
 Backs Coach: Ric Hennessy
 Forwards Coach: Leonardo Fierro
 Assistant Coach: Mikko Moilanen
 Physio: Riikka Nortia
 Team Manager: Niina Tikkanen

See also
 Rugby union in Finland

References

External links
 Finland on IRB.com
 Rugby Finland 
 Finland  on RugbyData.com

rugby
European national women's rugby union teams
Rugby union in Finland